Priscilla Negrón (born May 22, 1984) is an Ecuadorian actress.

Biography
Priscilla Negrón was born in Guayaquil on May 22, 1984. She studied acting in Buenos Aires and in the United States. She moved into comedic acting in 2006, appearing on the series Kliffor, starring . The following year, she starred in the comedy El hombre de la casa alongside , Alejandra Paredes, and Azucena Mora.

In 2009, she joined Teleamazonas, and was cast in the successful comedy , playing Señora Negrón, one of the best friends of "La Mofle". This became one of her best-known roles. In 2010, she joined the cast of the telenovela  on TC Televisión. In 2012, she returned to La pareja feliz in its third season, and remained with it until its conclusion in 2014.

In 2016, she played Luminitza in the series Los Hijos de Don Juan on TC Televisión.

In 2018, Negrón returned to Ecuavisa and appeared in the biographical telenovela , where she played Tere Bermeo, a character based on Tani Bermeo, the sister of the late singer Edith Bermeo, better known as Sharon. She reprised the role the following year in the second season (now known as Sharon 2: El desenlace), and joined the cast of the fifth season of the comedy .

TV series and telenovelas

References

1984 births
Ecuadorian stage actresses
Ecuadorian telenovela actresses
Living people
People from Guayaquil
21st-century Ecuadorian women